Stills may refer to:
 Still, a device used for distillation
 Film still, a photograph used for the advertising of a film
 The Stills, a Canadian indie rock band
 Stills (Gauntlet Hair album) (2013)
 Stills (Stephen Stills album) (1975)
 Stills, an EP by God Help the Girl
 Still's disease (disambiguation)

People with the surname
 Chris Stills (born 1974), American musician
 Dante Stills (born 1999), American football player 
 Darius Stills (born 1998), American football player
 Gary Stills (born 1974), American football player
 Stephen Stills (born 1945), American guitarist and singer-songwriter

See also 
 Still (disambiguation)